Kang Dae-ho (born September 14, 1997), better known by his stage name Gaho, is a South Korean singer, songwriter and producer under Planetarium Records.

Early life
Gaho was born on September 14, 1997.

Career

2018–present: Solo debut
Gaho made his debut with the release of the soundtracks "Time", "Heart Is Beating" and "Not Over" for The Time, My Secret Terrius and The Last Empress respectively. On December 11, 2018 Gaho released his first mini album Preparation For a Journey. He released the singles "Fly" and "Pink Walk" in 2019. He rose to prominence with the original soundtrack "Start Over" for the JTBC drama Itaewon Class which charted number one on the Gaon Digital Chart. On March 26, 2020 he released the single "A Song for You". On May 24, 2021, he released "Rush Hour."  On August 12, 2021, he released "Ride".  On November 23, 2021, Gaho released his first studio album Fireworks. Praised for his unique vocals and wide range, Gaho is also known for his covers of KPop hit songs such as BTS' "Fire" and BlackPink's "How You Like That " and ''Shut Down'' often partnering with the band, KAVE.

Discography

Studio albums

Extended play

Singles

Awards and nominations

Notes

References

External links

1997 births
Living people
South Korean male pop singers
21st-century South Korean male  singers